The Australian one-hundred-dollar note was first issued in 1984 as a paper note. There have been two different issues of this denomination: initially a very light turquoise-blue paper note, and from May 1996, a green polymer note. Since the start of issue there have been six signature combinations. Two other combinations were not issued.

Design
The paper issue has a portrait of Antarctic explorer Sir Douglas Mawson, with a background of a mountain range with a geological strata format. A large diamond shape appears to the left of the main picture. Astronomer John Tebbutt is on the reverse, with a background of the observatory he built and a local church.

The polymer issue was designed by Bruce Stewart, and features portraits of soprano Dame Nellie Melba and engineer and First World War general Sir John Monash, along with images from the First World War and John Simpson Kirkpatrick and his donkey. . 

A new design of the banknote, part of the Reserve Bank's Next Generation Banknote Program, was released into circulation on 29 October 2020.

Security features
The paper design includes a watermark of Captain James Cook in the white field, and a metallic strip embedded in the paper to the left (on the obverse side) of the note. The same watermark was used in the last issue of the pre-decimal banknotes.

The polymer issue includes a shadow image of the Australian Coat of Arms, which is printed over. In the clear window, there is embossing—or a raised image—of the number 100 and a print of a lyrebird. Also for this issue, fluorescent colouring was added to the serial numbers, as well as a patch that shows the banknote's value under ultraviolet light. The star's four points on the obverse and three on the reverse join to form the seven-pointed Federation Star when the note is held up to the light. Raised print and micro-printing of the denomination value are also included.

Circulation
According to Reserve Bank of Australia statistics, the number of $100 banknotes in circulation in June 2005 was 149 million—18.5% of all notes in circulation. The cash value for these notes was $14,924 million—41.9% of the total value for all denominations. Only the $50 note had more cash value in circulation. In June 2008 there were 176.9 million notes in circulation (19%), with a value of $17,690 million (42.1%). 

In June 2017, 337 million $100 notes were in circulation, 22% of the total notes in circulation; worth $33,689 million, 46% of the total value for all denominations.

In December 2016 it was reported that Australia may abolish its $100 note to close down loopholes used by the black economy. However, the Reserve Bank of Australia officially stated that there are no plans to abolish the $100 note.

References

Further reading

Banknotes of Australia
Currencies introduced in 1984
One-hundred-base-unit banknotes
Cultural depictions of Nellie Melba